Below is the list of populated places in Hatay Province, Turkey by the districts. Unlike most other provinces of Turkey, in Hatay the capital of the province and the province don't bear the same name. The capital of the province is Antakya. In the following lists first place in each list is the administrative center of the district.

Antakya
Antakya
Açıkdere, Antakya
Akcurun, Antakya
Akçaova, Antakya
Akhisar, Antakya
Alaattin, Antakya
Alahan, Antakya
Alazı, Antakya
Anayazı, Antakya
Apaydın, Antakya
Arpahan, Antakya
Aşağıoba, Antakya
Aşağıokçular, Antakya
Avsuyu, Antakya
Bahçeköy, Antakya
Balıklıdere, Antakya
Ballıöz, Antakya
Bitiren, Antakya
Bohşin, Antakya
Bostancık, Antakya
Bozhöyük, Antakya
Bozlu, Antakya
Büyükdalyan, Antakya
Çardaklı, Antakya
Çatbaşı, Antakya
Çayır, Antakya
Çekmece, Antakya
Dağdüzü, Antakya
Değirmenyolu, Antakya
Demirköprü, Antakya
Derince, Antakya
Dikmece, Antakya
Doğanköy, Antakya
Döver, Antakya
Dursunlu, Antakya
Ekinci, Antakya
Gökçegöz, Antakya
Gülderen, Antakya
Gümüşgöze, Antakya
Güneysöğüt, Antakya
Günyazı, Antakya
Güzelburç, Antakya
Hanyolu, Antakya
Harbiye, Antakya
Hasanlı, Antakya
Karaali, Antakya
Karlısu, Antakya
Karşıyaka, Antakya
Kisecik, Antakya
Koçören, Antakya
Kuruyer, Antakya
Kuzeytepe, Antakya
Küçükdalyan, Antakya
Madenboyu, Antakya
Mansurlu, Antakya
Maraşboğazı, Antakya
Maşuklu, Antakya
Melekli, Antakya
Meydancık, Antakya
Narlıca, Antakya
Odabaşı, Antakya
Oğlakören, Antakya
Orhanlı, Antakya
Ovakent, Antakya
Paşaköy, Antakya
Saçaklı, Antakya
Samankaya, Antakya
Saraycık, Antakya
Serinyol, Antakya
Sinanlı, Antakya
Sofular, Antakya
Subaşı, Antakya
Suvatlı, Antakya
Şenköy, Antakya
Tahtaköprü, Antakya
Tanışma, Antakya
Toygarlı, Antakya
Turfanda, Antakya
Turunçlu, Antakya
Uzunaliç, Antakya
Üçgedik, Antakya
Üzümdalı, Antakya
Yaylacık, Antakya
Yeşilova, Antakya
Yeşilpınar, Antakya
Yoncakaya, Antakya
Yukarıokçular, Antakya
Zülüflühan, Antakya

Altınözü 
Altınözü
Akamber, Altınözü
Akdarı, Altınözü
Alakent, Altınözü
Altınkaya, Altınözü
Atayurdu, Altınözü
Avuttepe, Altınözü
Babatorun
Boynuyoğun, Altınözü
Büyükburç, Altınözü
Çetenli, Altınözü
Dokuzdal, Altınözü
Enek, Altınözü
Erbaşı, Altınözü
Gözecik, Altınözü
Günvuran, Altınözü
Hacıpaşa, Altınözü
Kamberli, Altınözü
Kansu, Altınözü
Karbeyaz, Altınözü
Karsu, Altınözü
Kazancık, Altınözü
Keskincik, Altınözü
Kılıçtutan, Altınözü
Kıyıgören, Altınözü
Kolcular, Altınözü
Kozkalesi, Altınözü
Kurtmezraası, Altınözü
Mayadalı, Altınözü
Oymaklı, Altınözü
Sarıbük, Altınözü
Seferli, Altınözü
Sivrikavak, Altınözü
Tepehan, Altınözü
Tokaçlı, Altınözü
Tokdemir, Altınözü
Toprakhisar, Altınözü
Türkmenmezraası, Altınözü
Yanıkpınar, Altınözü
Yarseli, Altınözü
Yenihisar, Altınözü
Yolağzı, Altınözü
Yunushanı, Altınözü
Ziyaret, Altınözü

Belen

Belen
Atik, Belen
Benlidere, Belen
Çakallı, Belen
Çerçikaya, Belen
Güzelyayla, Belen
Karapelit, Belen
Kıcı, Belen
Kömürçukuru, Belen
Müftüler, Belen
Ötençay, Belen
Şenbük, Belen

Dörtyol
Dörtyol
Altınçağ, Dörtyol
Çağlalık, Dörtyol
Çatköy, Dörtyol
Kapılı, Dörtyol
Karakese, Dörtyol
Konaklı, Dörtyol
Kozludere, Dörtyol
Kuzuculu, Dörtyol
Payas, Dörtyol
Sincan, Dörtyol
Yeniyurt, Dörtyol
Yeşilköy, Dörtyol

Hassa
Hassa
Akbez, Hassa
Akkülek, Hassa
Aktepe, Hassa
Ardıçlı, Hassa
Arpalıuşağı, Hassa
Aşağıkarafakılı, Hassa
Bademli, Hassa
Bintaş, Hassa
Buhara, Hassa
Çınarbaşı, Hassa
Dedemli, Hassa
Demrek, Hassa
Eğribucak, Hassa
Gazeluşağı, Hassa
Gülkent, Hassa
Gülpınar, Hassa
Güvenç, Hassa
Hacılar, Hassa
Haydarlar, Hassa
Katranlık, Hassa
Koruhüyük, Hassa
Küreci, Hassa
Mazmanlı, Hassa
Sapanözü, Hassa
Söğüt, Hassa
Sugediği, Hassa
Tiyek, Hassa
Yeniyapan, Hassa
Yoluklar, Hassa
Yukarıbucak, Hassa
Yukarıkarafakılı, Hassa
Yuvalı, Hassa
Zeytinoba, Hassa

Erzin
Erzin
Aşağıburnaz, Erzin
Başlamış, Erzin
Gökdere, Erzin
Gökgöl, Erzin
Kızlarçayı, Erzin
Kuyuluk, Erzin
Turunçlu, Erzin
Yeşiltepe, Erzin
Yoncadüzü, Erzin
Yukarıburnaz, Erzin

İskenderun
İskenderun
Akarca, İskenderun
Akçalı, İskenderun
Arpaderesi, İskenderun
Arpagedik, İskenderun
Arsuz, İskenderun
Aşkarbeyli, İskenderun
Avcılarsuyu, İskenderun
Azganlık, İskenderun
Bekbele, İskenderun
Bey, İskenderun
Bitişik, İskenderun
Büyükdere, İskenderun
Cırtıman, İskenderun
Çınarlı, İskenderun
Denizciler, İskenderun
Derekuyu, İskenderun
Düğünyurdu, İskenderun
Gökmeydan, İskenderun
Gözcüler, İskenderun
Gülcihan, İskenderun
Güzelköy, İskenderun
Hacıahmetli, İskenderun
Harlısu, İskenderun
Haymaseki, İskenderun
Helvalı, İskenderun
Hüyük, İskenderun
Işıklı, İskenderun
Kale, İskenderun
Kaledibi, İskenderun
Karaağaç, İskenderun
Karagöz, İskenderun
Karahüseyinli, İskenderun
Karayılan, İskenderun
Kavaklıoluk, İskenderun
Kepirce, İskenderun
Kışla, İskenderun
Konacık, İskenderun
Kozaklı, İskenderun
Kurtbağı, İskenderun
Madenli, İskenderun
Nardüzü, İskenderun
Nergizlik, İskenderu
Orhangazi, İskenderun
Pirinçlik, İskenderun
Sarıseki, İskenderun
Suçıkağı, İskenderun
Tatarlı, İskenderun
Tülek, İskenderun
Üçgüllük, İskenderun
Yukarıkepirce, İskenderun

Kırıkhan
Kırıkhan
Abalaklı, Kırıkhan
Adalar, Kırıkhan
Alaybeyli, Kırıkhan
Alibeyçağıllı, Kırıkhan
Arkıtça, Kırıkhan
Attutan, Kırıkhan
Aygırgölü, Kırıkhan
Balarmudu, Kırıkhan
Baldıran, Kırıkhan
Başpınar, Kırıkhan
Bektaşlı, Kırıkhan
Camuzkışlası, Kırıkhan
Ceylanlı, Kırıkhan
Çamsarı, Kırıkhan
Çamseki, Kırıkhan
Çataltepe, Kırıkhan
Çiloğlanhüyüğü, Kırıkhan
Danaahmetli, Kırıkhan
Dedeçınar, Kırıkhan
Delibekirli, Kırıkhan
Demirkonak, Kırıkhan
Gölbaşı, Kırıkhan
Gültepe, Kırıkhan
Güventaşı, Kırıkhan
Güzelce, Kırıkhan
Ilıkpınar, Kırıkhan
İçada, Kırıkhan
İncirli, Kırıkhan
Kaletepe, Kırıkhan
Kamberlikaya, Kırıkhan
Kamışlar, Kırıkhan
Kangallar, Kırıkhan
Karaçağıl, Kırıkhan
Karadurmuşlu, Kırıkhan
Karaelmaslı, Kırıkhan
Karamağara, Kırıkhan
Karamankaşı, Kırıkhan
Karataş, Kırıkhan
Kazkeli, Kırıkhan
Kodallı, Kırıkhan
Kurtlusarımazı, Kırıkhan
Kurtlusoğuksu, Kırıkhan
Mahmutlu, Kırıkhan
Muratpaşa, Kırıkhan
Muratpaşakızılkaya, Kırıkhan
Narlıhopur, Kırıkhan
Özkızılkaya, Kırıkhan
Özsoğuksu, Kırıkhan
Reşatlı, Kırıkhan
Saylak, Kırıkhan
Söğütlüöz, Kırıkhan
Sucuköy, Kırıkhan
Taşoluk, Kırıkhan
Topboğazı, Kırıkhan
Torun, Kırıkhan
Yalangoz, Kırıkhan
Yılanlı, Kırıkhan

Kumlu

Kumlu
Akkerpiç, Kumlu
Akkuyu, Kumlu
Akpınar, Kumlu
Aktaş, Kumlu
Batıayrancı, Kumlu
Doğuayrancı, Kumlu
Gülova, Kumlu
Hamam, Kumlu
Hatayhamamı, Kumlu
Kaletepe, Kumlu
Keli, Kumlu
Kırcaoğlu, Kumlu
Muharrem, Kumlu

Reyhanlı

Reyhanlı
Ahmetbeyli, Reyhanlı
Akyayla, Reyhanlı
Alakuzu, Reyhanlı
Beşaslan, Reyhanlı
Bükülmez, Reyhanlı
Cilvegözü, Reyhanlı
Cumhuriyet, Reyhanlı
Çakıryiğit, Reyhanlı
Davutpaşa, Reyhanlı
Fevzipaşa, Reyhanlı
Gazimürseltepesi, Reyhanlı
Göktepe, Reyhanlı
Karacanlık, Reyhanlı
Karahüyük, Reyhanlı
Karasüleymanlı, Reyhanlı
Kavalcık, Reyhanlı
Konuk, Reyhanlı
Kuletepe, Reyhanlı
Kumtepe, Reyhanlı
Kurtuluş, Reyhanlı
Kuşaklı, Reyhanlı
Mehmetbeyli, Reyhanlı
Oğulpınar, Reyhanlı
Paşahüyük, Reyhanlı
Paşaköy, Reyhanlı
Suluköy, Reyhanlı
Tayfursökmen, Reyhanlı
Terzihüyük, Reyhanlı
Uzunkavak, Reyhanlı
Üçtepe, Reyhanlı
Varışlı, Reyhanlı

Samandağ

Samandağ
Aknehir, Samandağ
Ataköy, Samandağ
Avcılar, Samandağ
Batıayaz, Samandağ
Büyükçat, Samandağ
Büyükoba, Samandağ
Ceylandere, Samandağ
Çamlıyayla, Samandağ
Çanakoluk, Samandağ
Çınarlı, Samandağ
Çöğürlü, Samandağ
Çökek, Samandağ
Çubuklu, Samandağ
Değirmenbaşı, Samandağ
Eriklikuyu, Samandağ
Fidanlı, Samandağ
Gözene, Samandağ
Hancağız, Samandağ
Hıdırbey, Samandağ
Huzurlu, Samandağ
Hüseyinli, Samandağ
Kapısuyu, Samandağ
Karaçay, Samandağ
Koyunoğlu, Samandağ
Kuşalanı, Samandağ
Mağaracık, Samandağ
Meydan, Samandağ
Mızraklı, Samandağ
Özbek, Samandağ
Seldiren, Samandağ
Sutaşı, Samandağ
Tavla, Samandağ
Tekebaşı, Samandağ
Tomruksuyu, Samandağ
Uzunbağ, Samandağ
Üzengili, Samandağ
Vakıflı, Samandağ
Yaylıca, Samandağ
Yeniçağ, Samandağ
Yeniköy, Samandağ
Yeşilköy, Samandağ
Yeşilyazı, Samandağ
Yoğunoluk, Samandağ

Yayladağ

Yayladağı
Arslanyazı, Yayladağı
Aşağıpulluyazı, Yayladağı
Aydınbahçe, Yayladağı
Ayışığı, Yayladağı
Çabala, Yayladağı
Çakı, Yayladağı
Çandır, Yayladağı
Denizgören, Yayladağı
Eğerci, Yayladağı
Görentaş, Yayladağı
Gözlekçiler, Yayladağı
Gözlüce, Yayladağı
Gürışık, Yayladağı
Güveççi, Yayladağı
Güzelyurt, Yayladağı
Hisarcık, Yayladağı
Karacurun, Yayladağı
Karaköse, Yayladağı
Kışlak, Yayladağı
Kızılçat, Yayladağı
Kösrelik, Yayladağı
Kulaç, Yayladağı
Leylekli, Yayladağı
Olgunlar, Yayladağı
Sebenoba, Yayladağı
Sungur, Yayladağı
Sürütme, Yayladağı
Şakşak, Yayladağı
Uluyol, Yayladağı
Üçırmak, Yayladağı
Yalaz, Yayladağı
Yayıkdamlar, Yayladağı
Yeditepe, Yayladağı
Yenice, Yayladağı
Yeşiltepe, Yayladağı
Yukarıpulluyazı, Yayladağı

Recent development

According to Law act no 6360, all Turkish provinces with a population more than 750 000, were renamed as metropolitan municipality. Furthermore, the two new districts were established; Defne and Payas. All districts in those provinces became second level municipalities and all villages in those districts  were renamed as a neighborhoods . Thus the villages listed above are officially neighborhoods of Hatay.

References

List
Mediterranean Region, Turkey
Hatay